Etymology is the study of the history of the form of words and, by extension, the origin and evolution of their semantic meaning across time. It is a subfield of historical linguistics, and draws upon comparative semantics, morphology, semiotics, and phonetics.

For languages with a long written history, etymologists make use of texts, and texts about the language, to gather knowledge about how words were used during earlier periods, how they developed in meaning and form, or when and how they entered the language. Etymologists also apply the methods of comparative linguistics to reconstruct information about forms that are too old for any direct information to be available. By analyzing related languages with a technique known as the comparative method, linguists can make inferences about their shared parent language and its vocabulary. In this way, word roots in many European languages, for example, can be traced all the way back to the origin of the Indo-European language family. 

Even though etymological research originated from the philological tradition, much current etymological research is done on language families where little or no early documentation is available, such as Uralic and Austronesian.

Etymology 

The term etymon refers to a word or morpheme (e.g., stem or root) from which a later word or morpheme derives. For example, the Latin word candidus, which means "white", is the etymon of English candid. Relationships are often less transparent, however. English place names such as Winchester, Gloucester, Tadcaster share in different modern forms a suffixed etymon that was once meaningful, Latin castrum 'fort'.

Methods

Etymologists apply a number of methods to study the origins of words, some of which are:

 Philological research. Changes in the form and meaning of the word can be traced with the aid of older texts, if such are available.
 Making use of dialectological data. The form or meaning of the word might show variations between dialects, which may yield clues about its earlier history.
 The comparative method. By a systematic comparison of related languages, etymologists may often be able to detect which words derive from their common ancestor language and which were instead later borrowed from another language.
 The study of semantic change. Etymologists must often make hypotheses about changes in the meaning of particular words. Such hypotheses are tested against the general knowledge of semantic shifts. For example, the assumption of a particular change of meaning may be substantiated by showing that the same type of change has occurred in other languages as well.

Types of word origins 

Etymological theory recognizes that words originate through a limited number of basic mechanisms, the most important of which are language change, borrowing (i.e., the adoption of "loanwords" from other languages); word formation such as derivation and compounding; and onomatopoeia and sound symbolism (i.e., the creation of imitative words such as "click" or "grunt").

While the origin of newly emerged words is often more or less transparent, it tends to become obscured through time due to sound change or semantic change. Due to sound change, it is not readily obvious that the English word set is related to the word sit (the former is originally a causative formation of the latter). It is even less obvious that bless is related to blood (the former was originally a derivative with the meaning "to mark with blood").

Semantic change may also occur. For example, the English word bead originally meant "prayer". It acquired its modern meaning through the practice of counting the recitation of prayers by using beads.

History 
The search for meaningful origins for familiar or strange words is far older than the modern understanding of linguistic evolution and the relationships of languages, which began no earlier than the 18th century. Plutarch employed etymologies insecurely based on fancied resemblances in sounds. Isidore of Seville's Etymologiae was an encyclopedic tracing of "first things" that remained uncritically in use in Europe until the sixteenth century. Etymologicum genuinum is a grammatical encyclopedia edited at Constantinople in the ninth century, one of several similar Byzantine works. The thirteenth-century Legenda Aurea, as written by Jacobus de Varagine, begins each vita of a saint with a fanciful excursus in the form of an etymology.

Ancient Sanskrit

The Sanskrit linguists and grammarians of ancient India were the first to make a comprehensive analysis of linguistics and etymology. The study of Sanskrit etymology has provided Western scholars with the basis of historical linguistics and modern etymology. Four of the most famous Sanskrit linguists are:

 Yaska ( centuries BCE)
  (c. 520–460 BCE)
  (6th-4th centuries BCE)
  (2nd century BCE)

These linguists were not the earliest Sanskrit grammarians, however. They followed a line of ancient grammarians of Sanskrit who lived several centuries earlier like Sakatayana of whom very little is known. The earliest of attested etymologies can be found in Vedic literature in the philosophical explanations of the Brahmanas, Aranyakas, and Upanishads.

The analyses of Sanskrit grammar done by the previously mentioned linguists involved extensive studies on the etymology (called Nirukta or Vyutpatti in Sanskrit) of Sanskrit words, because the ancient Indians considered sound and speech itself to be sacred and, for them, the words of the sacred Vedas contained deep encoding of the mysteries of the soul and God.

Ancient Greco-Roman
One of the earliest philosophical texts of the Classical Greek period to address etymology was the Socratic dialogue Cratylus (c. 360 BCE) by Plato. During much of the dialogue, Socrates makes guesses as to the origins of many words, including the names of the gods. In his Odes Pindar spins complimentary etymologies to flatter his patrons. Plutarch (Life of Numa Pompilius) spins an etymology for pontifex,  while explicitly dismissing the obvious, and actual "bridge-builder":
 The priests, called Pontifices.... have the name of Pontifices from potens, powerful because they attend the service of the gods, who have power and command overall. Others make the word refer to exceptions of impossible cases; the priests were to perform all the duties possible; if anything lays beyond their power, the exception was not to be cavilled. The most common opinion is the most absurd, which derives this word from pons, and assigns the priests the title of bridge-makers. The sacrifices performed on the bridge were amongst the most sacred and ancient, and the keeping and repairing of the bridge attached, like any other public sacred office, to the priesthood.

Medieval

Isidore of Seville compiled a volume of etymologies to illuminate the triumph of religion. Each saint's legend in Jacobus de Varagine's Legenda Aurea begins with an etymological discourse on the saint's name:
 Lucy is said of light, and light is beauty in beholding, after that S. Ambrose saith: The nature of light is such, she is gracious in beholding, she spreadeth over all without lying down, she passeth in going right without crooking by right long line; and it is without dilation of tarrying, and therefore it is showed the blessed Lucy hath beauty of virginity without any corruption; essence of charity without disordinate love; rightful going and devotion to God, without squaring out of the way; right long line by continual work without negligence of slothful tarrying. In Lucy is said, the way of light.

Modern era

Etymology in the modern sense emerged in the late 18th-century European academia, within the context of the wider "Age of Enlightenment," although preceded by 17th century pioneers such as Marcus Zuerius van Boxhorn, Gerardus Vossius, Stephen Skinner, Elisha Coles, and William Wotton.  The first known systematic attempt to prove the relationship between two languages on the basis of similarity of grammar and lexicon was made in 1770 by the Hungarian, János Sajnovics, when he attempted to demonstrate the relationship between Sami and Hungarian (work that was later extended to the whole Finno-Ugric language family in 1799 by his fellow countryman, Samuel Gyarmathi).

The origin of modern historical linguistics is often traced to Sir William Jones, a Welsh philologist living in India, who in 1782 observed the genetic relationship between Sanskrit, Greek and Latin. Jones published his The Sanscrit Language in 1786, laying the foundation for the field of Indo-European linguistics.

The study of etymology in Germanic philology was introduced by Rasmus Christian Rask in the early 19th century and elevated to a high standard with the German Dictionary of the Brothers Grimm. The successes of the comparative approach culminated in the Neogrammarian school of the late 19th century. Still in the 19th century, German philosopher Friedrich Nietzsche used etymological strategies (principally and most famously in On the Genealogy of Morals, but also elsewhere) to argue that moral values have definite historical (specifically, cultural) origins where modulations in meaning regarding certain concepts (such as "good" and "evil") show how these ideas had changed over time—according to which value-system appropriated them. This strategy gained popularity in the 20th century, and philosophers, such as Jacques Derrida, have used etymologies to indicate former meanings of words to de-center the "violent hierarchies" of Western philosophy.

Notable etymologists
Ernest Klein (1899-1983), Hungarian-born Romanian-Canadian linguist, etymologist
Marko Snoj (born 1959), Indo-Europeanist, Slavist, Albanologist, lexicographer, and etymologist
Anatoly Liberman (born 1937),  linguist, medievalist, etymologist, poet, translator of poetry and literary critic
Michael Quinion (born c. 1943)

See also 

 Examples
 Etymological dictionary
 Lists of etymologies
 Place name origins
 Fallacies
 
 
 
 
 
 
 
 Linguistic studies and concepts
 
 Surface analysis (surface etymology)
 
 
 
 
 
 
 Processes of word formation
 
 Epeolatry

Notes

References
 Alfred Bammesberger. English Etymology. Heidelberg: Carl Winter, 1984.
 Philip Durkin. “Etymology”, in Encyclopedia of Language and Linguistics, 2nd edn. Ed. Keith Brown. Vol. 4. Oxford: Elsevier, 2006, pp. 260–7.
 Philip Durkin. The Oxford Guide to Etymology. Oxford/NY: Oxford University Press, 2009.
 William B. Lockwood. An Informal Introduction to English Etymology. Montreux, London: Minerva Press, 1995.
 Yakov Malkiel. Etymology. Cambridge: Cambridge University Press, 1993.
 Alan S. C. Ross. Etymology, with a special reference to English. Fair Lawn, N.J.: Essential Books; London: Deutsch, 1958.
 Michael Samuels. Linguistic Evolution: With Special Reference to English. Cambridge: Cambridge University Press, 1972.
 Bo Svensén. “Etymology”, chap. 19 of A Handbook of Lexicography: The Theory and Practice of Dictionary-Making. Cambridge/NY: Cambridge University Press, 2009.
 Walther von Wartburg. Problems and Methods in Linguistics, rev. edn. with the collaboration of Stephen Ullmann. Trans. Joyce M. H. Reid. Oxford: Blackwell, 1969.

External links

.
List of etymologies of words in 90+ languages.
Online Etymology Dictionary.